State Highway 7 (West Bengal) is a state highway in West Bengal, India.

Route
SH 7 originates from Rajgram (the road extends up to Kanupur on NH 12) and passes through Murarai, Nalhati, Lohapur (it is a little off the highway), Morgram, Khargram, Nagar, Burwan, Nutanhat, Mongalkote, Mirzapur, Bardhaman, Sagrai, Badulia, Seharabazar, Arambag, Kamarpukur, Gar Mandaran, Khirpai, Chandrakona, Keshpur and terminates in junction with NH 14 at Midnapore.

The total length of SH 7 is 289 km.

Districts traversed by SH 7 are:
Birbhum district (0 – 31 km)Murshiadabad (31-100)Purba Bardhaman district (100 – 196) kmHooghly district (196 – 226 km)Paschim Medinipur district (226-289)

Road sections
It is divided into different sections as follows:

See also
List of state highways in West Bengal

References

State Highways in West Bengal
Transport in Birbhum district